Arena of Thyatis is an adventure module published in 1990 for the Dungeons & Dragons fantasy role-playing game. This module is linked with Legions of Thyatis.

Plot summary
Arena of Thyatis is an adventure scenario intended to be used with Dawn of the Emperors, in which the player characters have dealings with a senator from Thyatis and are then involved arena combat in the Coliseum.

Publication history
DDA1 Arena of Thyatis was written by John Nephew, with a cover by Brom, and was published by TSR in 1990 as a 32-page booklet with an outer folder. Editing is by Jon Pickens.

Reception
Ken Rolston reviewed the adventure for Dragon magazine #171 in July 1991. He reviewed it with Legions of Thyatis, and called them "two ambitious and original approaches to low-level D&D adventures", noting gladiators as the theme, and calling the setting "a D&D-game version of ancient Rome". He did, however, feel that this adventure may not be suitable for players' first D&D campaigns, where a first-time DM would be simultaneously trying to master the mechanics and rhythm of refereeing an FRPG and the subtle dramatic and manipulative techniques of open-ended scenario presentation. Rolston concluded the review of the two modules by stating: "Give them a split grade: four stars for originality, charm, roleplaying potential, and right-mindedness, and two stars for quality of DM staging, plot support, and suitability for D&D-game-style play. I do not recommend them for beginning DMs, but as an earnest and moderately successful approach to designing a module for open-ended, improvisational role-playing for the D&D game".

References

Dungeons & Dragons modules
Mystara
Role-playing game supplements introduced in 1990